Kapori (Kapauri) is a Papuan language of Pagai village in Airu District, Jayapura Regency, Papua, Indonesia.

Vocabulary
The following basic vocabulary words are from Voorhoeve (1975), as cited in the Trans-New Guinea database:

{| class="wikitable sortable"
! gloss !! Kapauri
|-
| head || aure
|-
| hair || su
|-
| eye || hukwani
|-
| tooth || wano
|-
| leg || tie
|-
| louse || usa
|-
| dog || unu
|-
| bird || irini
|-
| egg || hwini
|-
| blood || kumu
|-
| bone || uw
|-
| skin || ufunu
|-
| tree || tretaro
|-
| man || inaptei
|-
| sun || niki
|-
| water || bu
|-
| fire || sene
|-
| stone || liti
|-
| name || witini
|-
| eat || taro
|-
| one || kakua
|-
| two || nafrine
|}

Further reading
Rumaropen, Benny. 2006. Survey Report on the Kapauri Language of Papua, Indonesia. Unpublished ms. Jayapura: SIL Indonesia.

References

Languages of western New Guinea
Kapauri–Sause languages
Language isolates of New Guinea